Codela Airport  is an airport serving the town of Pocora in Limón Province, Costa Rica. The airport is midway between Guácimo and Siquirres.

See also

 Transport in Costa Rica
 List of airports in Costa Rica

References

External links
 OpenStreetMap - Codela
 HERE/Nokia - Codela

Airports in Costa Rica
Limón Province